The Abrams P-1 Explorer was an American purpose-designed aerial photography and survey aircraft that first flew in November 1937.

Design and development
The Explorer was designed by aerial survey pioneer Talbert Abrams, to meet his needs for a stable aircraft with excellent visibility for his work.  Abrams was an early aerial photographer in World War I. He used a Curtiss Jenny post-war, forming ABC airlines. In 1923, Abrams founded Abrams Aerial Survey Company and in 1937, Abrams Aircraft Corporation to build the specialized P-1 aircraft.

The standard single front-engined airplane of this era had many drawbacks for carrying out scientific photography. They were created to be nimble in the air rather than stable photographic platforms. Their engines leaked oil which would then flow under the aircraft and affect the camera lens. Finally, the loud engines made cockpit conversation difficult.

Abrams designed an aircraft with a rear engine to keep the camera apertures clean and reduce cockpit noise, and used a delta type wing to facilitate side vision. He hired engineers Kenneth Ronan and Andrew Edward Kunzl, in Marshall, Michigan, who drew plans and began construction in the former Page Brothers Buggy Company factory.

Ronan and Kunzl operated an aeronautical repair station at the Marshall airfield. Planning and construction took ten months, and resulted in an airplane designed for more efficient and economical aerial photography.

To create the clear nose so the pilot had an unobstructed view, Abrams hired the German company Rohm and Haas, creators of Plexiglas. With a wooden model of each window pane, the Plexiglas was clamped in a frame similar to a window frame. Heated until it began to sag, it was then pushed down by two workers holding the frame until it was molded to the wooden model.

The Plexiglas could then be trimmed and mounted in the frame work. When the Explorer came back for restoration, the panels which had been heated were as clear as when new, though were destroyed due to abuse during disassembly.

The Explorer was a low-wing aluminium monoplane with twin booms and a central nacelle for the pilot and camera equipment. The pod's nose section was extensively glazed in Plexiglas. The undercarriage was fixed and of tricycle configuration.

Originally powered with a  engine and a two-bladed propeller, it was sent back to Ronan & Kunzul to increase the horsepower to 450. This change required braces to be added from the wing top to the fuselage and they added a three-bladed propeller, with Abrams hoping the increased power would attract a buyer.

World War II interrupted Abrams's work, and the single aircraft built was put into storage for the duration of the war. Obsolete by the end of the conflict, it was donated to the US National Air and Space Museum in 1948, where it remains  awaiting restoration.

Variants
P-1: the initial design and prototype.
PC-4: Abrams planned a pressurized version of the P-1, named the PC-4 that did not go into production.

Operational history

The P-1 was flown with a variety of camera gear. The Abrams Instrument Corporation C-3 camera was used to produce 650 nine by nine inch photos per flight.

Restoration attempt 

In 1968, a group of aviation enthusiasts began a project to restore the Explorer, including Jim Linn, who worked at Abrams Aerial Survey, Ron Dietz, a student pilot and engineer at Oldsmobile Division of General Motors, and Ellis Hammond, President of the Michigan Aerospace Educational Association. They worked with Don Lopez, the Assistant Director of the Smithsonian's National Air and Space Museum to release the aircraft, and in January 1975 the Explorer was transported in a Michigan National Guard Lockheed C-130 Hercules to the Capital City Airport in Lansing, Michigan.

The aircraft was moved to a state-owned hangar, where Dietz carried out careful photography before any disassembly was done, as well as detailed tracings of all the lettering so it could be recreated accurately at the end of the project.

The wings were sent to Montcalm Community College, where they were stripped, cleaned, repainted and recovered with silver painted fabric. The instruments panels and controls were disassembled and restored by Dietz's colleagues at Oldsmobile.

The aircraft was physically moved to the Lansing Community College aviation program. However, the restoration attempt was never completed; in 1981, the Lansing Community College truck driving school returned the plane to the Paul E. Garber Preservation, Restoration, and Storage Facility of the Smithsonian, where it remains.

Specifications

See also

References

External links
 Smithsonian Institution
 www.youtube.com Forgotten aircraft: The Abrams Explorer (1930s documentary video)
 British Pathé 1938 
 Abrams P-1 Explorer, with many technical data and pictures at FliegerWeb.com, in German

1930s United States special-purpose aircraft
Twin-boom aircraft
Aircraft manufactured in the United States
Single-engined pusher aircraft
Aircraft first flown in 1937